Dr Julia R. Heiman is an American sexologist and psychologist.  The sixth Director of The Kinsey Institute for Research in Sex, Gender, and Reproduction at Indiana University, she began on June 1, 2004.  Dr. Heiman is also a professor in the Psychology Department at Indiana University with a joint appointment in the Psychiatry Department at the IU School of Medicine in Indianapolis.

Life and career
Heiman received a Bachelor of Arts (Psychology) in 1970 from Arizona State University, Tempe, Arizona, then a PhD in Clinical Psychology in 1975 from State University of New York at Stony Brook.  She performed a predoctoral internship from 1972 to 1974 at the Stony Brook Psychological Center and Patchogue-Medford School District.  She received postgraduate training as a National Institute of Mental Health funded postdoctoral research associate in 1975 from the Department of Psychiatry and Behavioral Sciences at the State University of New York at Stony Brook. She co-authored the self-help book Becoming Orgasmic with Joseph LoPiccolo in 1976.

Who's Who of American Women. 12th edition, 1981–1982. Wilmette, IL: Marquis Who's Who, 1981.

Who's Who of American Women. 13th edition, 1983–1984. Wilmette, IL: Marquis Who's Who, 1983.

Research
Heiman's research is concerned with the physiological and emotional dimensions of sexuality.  Her research interests include treatments for sexual difficulty, the impact of treatments for sexual difficulty on relationships, cross-cultural definitions of sexual satisfaction, sexual abuse and aggression, depression and sex, quality of sex experience in the wake of cancer, impact of childhood sexual abuse on adult relationships, and sexual risk taking.

Selected publications

Heiman J, LoPiccolo L, LoPiccolo J (1976). Becoming Orgasmic: A Sexual and Personal Growth Program for Women. Prentice-Hall, 
Heiman J, LoPiccolo J (1987). Becoming Orgasmic: A Sexual and Personal Growth Program for Women, (Rev Exp edition). Fireside,

References

External links
 Julia R. Heiman, Ph.D. CV
 

American women psychologists
21st-century American psychologists
American sexologists
Stony Brook University alumni
Arizona State University alumni
Year of birth missing (living people)
Living people
21st-century American women